Beaver Lumber (Castor Bricoleur in Quebec) was a Canadian building supply chain owned by Molson.  It was once Canada's fourth largest building supply chain with 138 stores.  In 2000 it was purchased by Home Hardware, a cooperative of over 1000 independent Canadian hardware stores. Beaver Lumber stores were rebranded as Home Building Centres.

History
Beaver Lumber, once Canada's leading supplier of lumber, building materials and related products and services, began in 1883 as the Banbury Bros. Lumber Company in Wolseley, Saskatchewan. Banbury Bros. Lumber Company bought its local rival, Gibson Lumber, in 1904 and two years later joined with the Regina Lumber and Supply Co., creating a business with twelve lumber yards. A thirst for expansion resulted in the Banbury brothers striking a deal with some Winnipeg lumber yards. A new name was needed that was in some way connected to wood, so when Edwin Banbury suggested "Beaver", the company identity was created in 1906 and would become an institution in parts of Canada for another 90 years.

Beaver Lumber was a community-based business and focused on building relationships with its customers. The company eventually operated 130 stores across the country.

Molson, the Montreal-based brewing giant, bought Beaver Lumber for $40 million in 1972. In 1987, Groupe Val Royal entered into a strategic agreement with the Molson Companies to acquire the Castor Bricoleur locations in Québec and integrated them to its  Brico Centre chain, a hardware retailer that was already operating three stores at the time. After Val-Royal launched the Réno-Dépôt chain in 1993 with its warehouse format, the eight Brico Centre stores were deemed too small to continue in the new economy and were progressively phased out from Quebec's retailing landscape. 

Molson sold the rest of retail chain to Home Hardware for $68 million in 1999.

Legacy
The first store opened by Edwin and his brother, Robert, was sold to the Wolseley Museum Association in 1980, who subsequently closed it and sold it to local entrepreneur, Jacquie Jacobs-Marshall. It stands on Blanchard Street and has been proposed as a future site of the Wolseley Heritage Foundation Archive.

Beaver Lumber's last Head Office at 7303 Warden Avenue in Markham is now home to Lyreco, Brookfield Properties and TTI.

References 

Defunct retail companies of Canada
Companies based in Markham, Ontario
Retail companies established in 1883
Hardware stores of Canada
1883 establishments in the Northwest Territories
Retail companies disestablished in 2000
2000 disestablishments in Ontario